Nanos is a dispersed settlement on Mount Nanos in the Municipality of Vipava in the Littoral region of Slovenia.

Name
The name of the settlement was changed from Ravnik to Nanos in 1955.

Church
The local church, built close to Pleša Peak on Mount Nanos, is dedicated to Saint Jerome and belongs to the Parish of Podnanos.

References

External links
Nanos at Geopedia

Populated places in the Municipality of Vipava